The Freda Sandstone is a geologic formation in Michigan. It dates back to the Proterozoic. Lithologically, the Freda Sandstone is a lithic, red-brown, cyclic sequence of sandstones, mudstones and shales (conglomerates are rare).

References
 

Stratigraphy of Michigan